The Hon. George Frederick Nugent Greville-Nugent (11 September 1842 – 11 May 1897), known as George Greville from 1883 to his death, was an Irish Liberal politician.

Greville-Nugent was the son of Fulke Greville-Nugent, 1st Baron Greville who was Liberal MP for Longford from 1852 and 1869, and brother of Reginald Greville-Nugent who was also elected for the seat in 1868.

Upon his brother's unseating in 1870, Greville-Nugent was elected for the same seat at a by-election in 1870. However, he did not contest the next general election in 1874.

References

External links
 

1842 births
1897 deaths
Irish Liberal Party MPs
Members of the Parliament of the United Kingdom for County Longford constituencies (1801–1922)
UK MPs 1868–1874
Younger sons of barons